Sadaejuui (lit. "thing-big-ism", meaning: "serving-the-Great ideology"; Hangul: 사대주의, Hanja: 事大主義) is a largely pejorative Korean term which evolved in the mid-20th century  from a more widely used historical concept.

The contemporary term sadaejuui was derived from the Chinese shi da (Korean, sadae) as used by the philosopher, Mencius.
 Sadae literally means "dealing with the great" or "serving the great" and interpreted as "Loving and admiring the great and powerful".
Juui means "ideology" and it is conventionally translated as "-ism."
In other words, sadaejuui is a compound-word composed of sadae + juui.

Etymology
The term "sadaejuui" was invented by early 20th century Korean nationalists.  The antecedents of this modern term is the historic term "sadae", which comes from the word  in Mencius's book,  which means "service to the great by the small" or "a small kingdom accommodates a large."

 
 

Mencius - Liang Hui Wang II

Overview
Sadaejuui conflates an attitude of subservience with the political realism which accompanies the prudent recognition of greater power.  Sadae describes a foreign policy characterized by the various ways a weaker nation-state such as Korea acknowledges the strength of a greater power such as China. Sadae is made manifest in the actions of the weaker nation-state as it conveys goodwill and respect through its envoys.

The utility of the sadae concept in Korea was recognized from the period of Three Kingdoms of Korea to 1897; and it is demonstrated in the relationship of mid-Joseon Korea towards the Ming dynasty of China. Joseon made every effort to maintain a friendly relationship with Beijing for reasons having to do with both realpolitik and an idealized Confucian worldview in which China is perceived as the center of a Confucian moral universe.

The kingdom of Joseon accepted its place in a Sinocentristic world order. The Joseon foreign policy was organized around maintaining stable Joseon–Chinese relations in the period from 1392 through 1910. It contrasts with limited trade relationships or kyorin diplomacy (교린정책/交隣政策; lit. "neighborly relations") in regard to Joseon-Japanese relations in this period.

The concept of sadaejuui was central in the writings of polemicist Shin Chaeho. His ideas and voice became prominent features of Korean nationalism.  Sin is known for having argued that the sadaejuui inherent in Confucian historiography served 
 to devalue the ethnic origins of the Korean people and state 
 to subjugate Korean history within a Confucian interpretive framework 
His revisionist writings sought to deny the relevance of sadae as an important element of Korean history.

In Modern politics 
In Korea, the term sadaejuui is a derogatory term criticizing those who do not support Korean resistance-nationalism that resists neighboring powers (mainly the United States, China and Japan) and show a 'conservative' (보수) or 'obedience' (굴종) attitude of conformity.

Sadaejuui can be seen as a conservative form of anti-nationalism. So, the left-wing "minjokjuui" (민족주의, lit. 'nationalism') are opposed to right-wing "sadaejuui" (사대주의). 

South Korean conservatives argue that the reason why Korea enjoyed diplomatic pacifism and economic prosperity is because of its sadaejuui (mainly pro-American, pro-Japan and historically pro-China) diplomacy policy. According to them, sadaejuui is the wisdom of ancestors. Indeed, North Korea's radical diplomatic egalitarian foreign policy of absolutely rejecting the feudal tradition of sadaejuui and trying to equal or superior to the powers of the world intensified economic difficulties as it isolated itself from all the powers around the U.S., China, Japan, and Russia.

Korean conservatism 

Sadae ideology is the traditional conservatism of pre-modern Koreans based on Confucianism, but it also has a certain influence on modern conservatives' diplomats in modern South Korean politics.

Sojunghwa 

Sojunghwa can be seen as a pro-Chinese sadae ideology.

It stood out in traditional Korean conservatism in the 19th century, but it is not supported by modern South Korean conservatives. The reason is that modern China is now a communist country, and modern South Korean conservatives are pro-American sadaejuuija (사대주의자, "thing-big-ist").

Ilminism 

The Korean National Youth Association (KNYA) is the root organization of ilminism. KNYA was more pro-American sentiment than other Korean nationalists, and United States Army Military Government in Korea supported KNYA.

Syngman Rhee and Ilminists supported conservative-nationalism based on anti-Japanese and anti-Chinese sentiment, but Rhee had less nationalist perception of the United States and rather had a 'pro-American sadaejuui' (친미 사대주의) perception. This contrasts with Kim Gu, a consistent right-wing 'nationalist' (민족주의).

New Right movemnets 

South Korea's pro-American and pro-Japanese conservative movement "New Right", has been criticized by experts as colonialism and sadaejuui. Some of them embrace the historical revisionism of Japanese right-wing. New Right movement has often been criticized by many South Korean media and experts for being "reactionary" (반동) or "far-right" (극우).

Cultural sadaejuui 
The term "sadaejuuija" is commonly used by liberals or leftists to attack conservatives because it is associated with Korean mainstream (non-religion) right-wing conservatism, but some far-right native Christian conservatives rather criticize LGBT rights activists or pro-Western/pro-UN cultural liberals as "cultural sadaejuuija" (문화사대주의자).

Anti-sadaejuui

In South Korea 
In modern South Korean politics, liberals and progressives equate "sadaejuui" with "colonialism" and view it very negatively, but conservatives view "sadaejuui" as a driving force for South Korea's economic development. The term "sadaejuuija" is mainly used by liberal-to-progressive nationalists to denounce conservatives' foreign and cultural policy. For example, liberals and progressives accuse conservatives of looking at the Korean language as inferior and having a sadaejuui perspective on the English language.

In North Korea 

The North Korea's government abhors the feudal and anti-nationalist ideology is sadaejuui, because North Korea's government is supports the far-left nationalist 'Juche ideology'. The term "pro-American sadae" (친미사대) is often used when North Korea criticizes South Korea. The North Korea's government also supports anti-imperialist foreign policy toward China and promotes anti-Chinese sentiment among its North Koraen people.

See also 
American Imperialism
 Anti-sadaejuui ideologies:
 Anti-Americanism in Korea
 Anti-Chineseism in Korea
 Anti-Japaneseism in Korea
 Left-wing nationalism
 Progressive nationalism in South Korea
 Minjokjuui
 Chinilpa
 Gyorin
 Realpolitik
 History of China#Imperial China
 Korea under Japanese rule
 Respectability politics
 Social Darwinism
 Treason
 Tribute
 Yoon Suk-yeol#Pro-Japanese colonialist controversy

Notes

References
 Alford, C. Fred. (1999). Think no evil: Korean values in the age of globalization. Ithaca: Cornell University Press. ;  OCLC 247000674
 Armstrong, Charles K. (2007). The Koreas. London: CRC Press. ; ;  OCLC 71808039
 Kang, Etsuko Hae-jin. (1997). Diplomacy and Ideology in Japanese-Korean Relations: from the Fifteenth to the Eighteenth Century. Basingstoke, Hampshire; Macmillan. ;
 Levinson, David and Karen Christensen. (2002). Encyclopedia of Modern Asia. New York: Charles Scribner's Sons. ; 
 Mansourov, Alexandre Y. "Will Flowers Bloom without Fragrance? Korean-Chinese Relations," Harvard Asia Quarterly (Spring 2009).
 Pratt, Keith L., Richard Rutt, and James Hoare. (1999). Korea: a historical and cultural dictionary, Richmond: Curzon Press. ; ;  OCLC 245844259
 Robinson, Michael. (1984) "National Identity and the Thought of Sin Ch'ae-ho: Sadaejuüi and Chuch'e in History and Politics." Journal of Korean Studies 5: 121–142.	
 Robinson, Michael. (1988). Cultural Nationalism in Colonial Korea, 1920–1925.'' Seattle: University of Washington Press. ;  OCLC 18106164

 
Anti-nationalism in Korea
Colonialism
Conservatism
Conservatism in South Korea
Ideologies
Korean Confucianism
Korean philosophy
Politics of Korea
Political theories
Political realism
Right-wing ideologies